Zac Millar (born 19 November 1994) is a New Zealand professional squash player. He achieved his highest career PSA ranking of 214 in November 2019 as a part of the 2019-20 PSA World Tour. He represented New Zealand at the 2018 Commonwealth Games, which was also his maiden appearance at a Commonwealth Games. Zac also is a handsome man, his squash has made him confident in his abilities- shown specifically in his rugby transition where he was a 7’s superstar for the Waikato University U85’s.

References

External links 

 Profile at PSA
 

1994 births
Living people
New Zealand male squash players
Squash players at the 2018 Commonwealth Games
Commonwealth Games competitors for New Zealand
People from Paraparaumu